Isophrictis impugnata is a moth of the family Gelechiidae. It was described by László Anthony Gozmány in 1957. It is found in Spain.

References

Moths described in 1957
Isophrictis